Talgat Bakytbekuly Zhailauov (Talğat Baqytbekūly Jailauov; born July 7, 1985) is a Kazakhstani professional ice hockey forward, currently plays for Kazzinc-Torpedo of the Kazakhstan Hockey Championship (KAZ). He participated at the 2010 IIHF World Championship as a member of the Kazakhstan men's national ice hockey team.

Playing career
Zhailauov played the first five seasons of his career with Kazzinc-Torpedo in the Supreme League of the Russian Ice Hockey Championship and Kazakhstan Hockey Championship. He had 35 goals and 63 points in 70 games with the team in 2006–07, and was signed by Barys Astana that offseason. He had 22 goals and 46 points with the team in the Supreme League during 2007–08, and helped the club earn a promotion to the Kontinental Hockey League in 2008.

Career statistics

Regular season and playoffs

International

Awards and achievements
 Asian Winter Games Gold Medal - 2011
 KHL All-Star Game – 2014

External links

1985 births
Living people
Barys Nur-Sultan players
Kazakhstani ice hockey centres
Kazzinc-Torpedo players
Sportspeople from Oskemen
Asian Games gold medalists for Kazakhstan
Asian Games silver medalists for Kazakhstan
Medalists at the 2007 Asian Winter Games
Medalists at the 2011 Asian Winter Games
Ice hockey players at the 2007 Asian Winter Games
Ice hockey players at the 2011 Asian Winter Games
Asian Games medalists in ice hockey